Ernest Newton  (12 September 1856 – 25 January 1922) was an English architect, President of Royal Institute of British Architects and founding member of the Art Workers' Guild.

Life
Newton was the son of an estate manager of Bickley, Kent.  He was educated at Uppingham School.  He married, in 1881, Antoinette Johanna Hoyack, of Rotterdam, and had three sons. He was resident again at Bickley in 1883 and built his own house at Bird in Hand Lane, Bickley in 1884.  In the next 20 years he built many houses in the Bickley and Chislehurst area – no two being identical.

Career

He served his apprenticeship in the office of Richard Norman Shaw from 1873 to 1876, remaining for a further three years as an assistant before commencing private practice on his own account in London in February 1880. He was briefly in partnership with William West Neve around 1882.  In 1884, he was a founder member of the Art Workers Guild.  He developed a career designing one-off houses largely in Bromley and Bickley and later moving into 'high-profile' country home commissions across England.

“He is one of the busiest architects in England and therefore represents the good principles of current thinking about the house in perhaps its most accessible form..." Hermann Muthesius The English House 1904.

“His eminence as an architect of unexcelled skill in a class of work that constitutes England's chief or sole claim to supremacy – the capture and apt embodiment of the very spirit of the home..."  Obituary, Architects' Journal; 1 February 1922, p187.

In the 1890s he acted as consulting architect to William Willett.  Newton was President of RIBA 1914–1917.  In 1918 he received the Royal Gold Medal for Architecture. In 1919, he was elected a Royal Academician, and was appointed a CBE in 1920. His last piece of
work was a war memorial at his former school at Uppingham.

Writing
He published Sketches for Country Residences (1882), A Book of Houses (1890 ), and A Book of Country Houses (1903).

“..a small house is in many ways more difficult to design than a large one, for while every part must be minutely schemed, nothing should be cramped or mean looking, the whole house should be conceived broadly and simply, and with an air of repose, the stamp of home." A Book of Houses

His son, William Godfrey Newton, (1885–1949), published The Work of Ernest Newton R.A. (1925).

Works in Kent
His works included:
 1881 St John's Parish Rooms, Park Road, Bromley
 1881 Additions to house in Chislehurst (not known)
 1882 Alterations to The Firs, Bickley Park Road
 1882 Alterations to house in Bickley (not known)
 1883 Sitka, South Wood Hill, Chislehurst
 1883 Alterations to house No. 1 in Bickley (not known)
 1883 St John's Parish Halls, Freelands Grove, Bromley
 1883 Alterations to house No. 2 in Bickley (not known)
 1884 Lyndhurst, 8 Bird in Hand lane, Bickley
 1884 Stables and Cottage at Bullers Wood,Chislehurst
 1884 House at Beckenham (not known)
 1885 Redcourt, 5 Hawthorne Road, Bickley
 1885 Beechcroft, 19 Bickley Road, Bickley
 1885 House at Bickley (not known)
 1886 Alterations to Sunnydale, Bickley Park Road
 1886 Alterations to Nutwood, Bickley Park Road
 1887 Parish Room at St George's Church, Bickley Park Road
 1887 Various works at Chislehurst
 1888 Mission Church, Widmore, Bromley
 1888 Works at Willow Grove, Chislehurst
 1888 Alterations to Swallowfield, Southlands Grove, Bickley
 1888 Ashton, Mead Road,Chislehurst
 1888 Alterations to Lingdale, Oldfield Road, Bickley
 1889 Remodelling of Bullers Wood, Logs Hill, Chislehurst
 1889 Elm Bank, Camden Park Road, Chislehurst
 1889 Alterations to Campville, Bickley (not known)
 1889 Alterations to Brodsworth, Beckenham (not known
 1890 Alterations to Farrants, Bickley Park Road, Bickley
 1890 Alterations to Camden Wood, Chislehurst (not known)
 1890 Alterations to Cowrie, Bickley (not known)
 1891 St Luke's Institute, Raglan Road, Bromley Common
 1891 238 Southlands Road, Bickley
 1891 Stables at Beechcroft, 17 Bickley Road, Bickley
 1892 St Swithun's Church, Hither Green, Lewisham
 1892 Stables and Cowsheds, Bickley Hall, Bickley Park Road
 1893 3 Grasmere Road, Bromley
 1893 St Barnabas Vicarage, Beckenham (not known)
 1893 Alterations to Bickley Vicarage, Bickley Park Road
 1893 Alterations to Amesbury House, Page Heath Lane, Bickley
 1893 Billiard Room at Camden Wood, Chislehurst
 1894 Alterations to Oakdell, 5 Pageheath Lane, Bickley
 1896 Alterations to a House at West Chislehurst (not known)
 1896 Type House for William Willett (88 Camden Park Road?)
 1898 Martins Bank, 181 – 183 High Street, Bromley
 1898 Shop, 179 High Street, Bromley
 1898 The Royal Bell Hotel, High Street Bromley
 1898 Alterations to Farrants, Bickley Park Road
 1898 Alterations to Calderwood, St Pauls Cray Road, Chislehurst
 1898 Electricity Works, Walters Yard, Bromley (demolished)
 1899 Molescroft, Widmore, Bromley
 1899 Alterations to Bromley College, London Road, Bromley
 1899 Alterations to Hayes Grove, Prestons Road, Hayes
 1899 House A, Bickley Park Estate, Hawthorne Rd, Bickley (demol.)
 1899 House B, Bickley Park Estate, Hawthorne Rd, Bickley (demol.)
 1899 House C, Bickley Park Estate, Hawthorne Rd, Bickley (demol.)
 1890 House at Chislehurst (Derwent House, Camden Park Road?)
 1901 Alterations to The George Inn, Hayes Street, Hayes
 1901 Alterations to Glebe House, George Lane, Hayes (demolished)
 1901 Alterations to Martins Bank, Summer Hill, Chislehurst
 1901 Alterations to Elmhurst, Bickley Park Road, Bickley
 1902 Nos 21 and 23 Page Heath Lane, Bickley
 1902 Alterations to Bickley hall, Chislehurst Rd, Bickley (demol.)
 1902 Billiard Room at Camden Hill, Chislehurst (not known)
 1902 18 Edward Road, Sundridge Park, Bromley
 1902 House D, Bickley Park Estate (35 Chislehurst Road)
 1903 Alterations to Bromley Palace, Widmore Road, Bromley
 1903 Alterations to Hartfield, Gates Green Road, Hayes (demol.)
 1904 House E, Bickley Park Estate (36 Chislehurst Road)
 1904 House F, Bickley Park Estate (38 Chislehurst Road)
 1904 House at Chislehurst for H P Henty (not known)
 1904 23 Garden Road, Sundridge Park, Bromley
 1904 Spire, St Georges Church, Bickley Park Road, Bickley
 1904 St Mary's Church Buildings, Farwig Lane, Bromley (demol)
 1905 House G, Bickley Park Estate (not known)
 1905 House H, Bickley Park Estate (not known)
 1905 House I, Bickley Park Estate (not known)
 1905 Alterations to Hawthorne, Hawthorne Road, Bickley
 1906 Stables for House F, Bickley Park Estate (not known)
 1909 Chancel Additions, St George's Church, Bickley (demol.)
 1909 Alterations to Glebe House, Hayes (demol.)
 1910 Alterations to Avonhurst, 76 Camden Park Road, Chislehurst
 1911 Swimming Bath at Amesbury School, Page Heath Lane, Bickley
 1920 Alterations to Bromley Palace, Widmore Road, Bromley

References

1856 births
1922 deaths
19th-century English architects
20th-century English architects
Architects from Kent
Fellows of the Royal Institute of British Architects
People from Bickley
People educated at Uppingham School
Recipients of the Royal Gold Medal
Presidents of the Royal Institute of British Architects
Royal Academicians